The Department of the Director of Underwater Weapons Materials originally known as the Torpedo Department was a former department of the British Department of Admiralty from 1917 to 1958 when it became the Underwater Weapons Division of the Weapons Department.

History
During the First World War in April 1917 the Torpedo Department of the Naval Ordnance Department was made a separate department in its own right this became known as the Department of the Director of Torpedoes and Mining. Following World War Two in 1946 it was renamed the Department of the Director of Underwater Weapons until October 1956 when it was renamed the Department of the Director of Underwater Weapons Materials. In 1958 the Naval Ordnance Department and this department became divisions of the new Weapons Department.

Head of Department
Included:

Directors of Torpedoes and Mining
 Rear-Admiral the Hon. Edward S. Fitzherbert: April 1917 – June 1918 
 Captain Frederick L. Field: June 1918 – April 1920 
 Captain Albert P. Addison: April 1920 – March 1922 
 Captain Leonard A.B.Donaldson: March 1922 – May 1924 
 Captain Brien M. Money: May 1924 – October 1926 
 Captain Arthur H. Walker: October 1926 – December 1928 
 Captain Brian Egerton: December 1928 – December 1931 
 Captain Henry R.Sawbridge: December 1931 – April 1934 
 Captain William B. Mackenzie: April 1934 – October 1935 
 Captain W. Frederic Wake-Walker: October 1935 – January 1938 
 Captain John U.P.Fitzgerald: January 1938 – February 1940 
 Captain Henry C. Phillips: February 1940 – February 1942 
 Captain Gervase B. Middleton: February 1942 – January 1943 (later Admiral)
 Captain Anthony Fane de Salis: February 1943 – November 1944 
 Captain William W. Davis: November 1944 – February 1946

Directors of Underwater Weapons
Included:
 Captain William W. Davis: February 1946 – January 1947
 Captain R. Oliver Bellasis: January 1947 – October 1948
 Captain A. H. Willis: June 1953 – October 1956
 Mr D. McArthur: January 1990 - May 1994

Directors of Underwater Weapons Materials
Included:
 Captain R. E. Portlock: October 1956 – January 1958

Deputy Directors of Torpedoes and Mining
Included:
 Captain Herbert N. Garnett: April 1919 – January 1921 
 Captain Wion de M. Egerton: January 1921 – November 1922 
 Captain Henry D. Bridges: November 1922 – August 1924 
 Captain Patrick E. Parker: August 1924 – September 1926 
 Captain Leonard F. Potter: September 1926 – March 1929 
 Captain Charles O. Alexander: March 1929 – September 1931 
 Captain John F.B. Carslake: September 1931 – February 1936 
 Captain Gervase B. Middleton: February 1936 – April 1938 
 Captain Norman V. Grace: May 1938 – April 1940 
 Captain Gervase B. Middleton: April 1940 – February 1942 
 Captain Edmund G. Abbott: December 1941 – September 1944 
 Captain Anthony Fane de Salis: February 1942 – February 1943 
 Captain Cecil R.L. Parry: September 1944 – 1946

Deputy Directors of Underwater Weapons
Included
 Captain Cecil R.L. Parry: September 1946 – August 1948
 Captain C. Hale: August 1948 – October 1948
 Captain A. B. Cole: August November 1955 – October 1956

Deputy Directors of Underwater Weapons Materials
 Captain M. R. G. Wingfield: September 1957 – January 1958

Deputy Directors of Underwater Weapons (Bath)
Included
 Captain L. F. Durnford Slater: 1946 – October 1948
 Captain Engineer W. S. C. Jenks: April 1955 – October 1956

Deputy Directors of Underwater Weapons Materials (Bath)
  Captain Engineer W. S. C. Jenks: October 1956 – January 1958

Deputy Directors of Underwater Weapons (A/S)
Included
 Captain J. G. Farrant: October 1945 – October 1948 (acting)

Note: Post abolished

References

Sources
 Great Britain, Admiralty (January 1958). The Navy List. London, England: HM Stationery Office.  
 Great Britain, Admiralty (July 1946). The Navy List. London, England: HM Stationery Office.  
 Great Britain, Admiralty (October 1948). The Navy List. London, England: HM Stationery Office.  
 Great Britain, Admiralty (April 1956). The Navy List. London, England: HM Stationery Office. 
 Mackie, Colin (January 2018). "Royal Navy Senior Appointments from 1865: Director of Torpedoes and Mining" (PDF). gulabin.com. C. Mackie.   
 "Records of Naval Ordnance Departments and Establishments". nationalarchives.gov.uk. National Archives UK. 1736–1974. Retrieved 3 February 2019.
 Whitaker, Joseph (1956). An Almanack by Joseph Whitaker, F.S.A., containing an account of the astronomical and other phenomena ...information respecting the government, finances, population, commerce, and general statistics of the various nations of the world, with special reference to the British empire and the United States. London, England: J Whitaker and Sons.

Admiralty departments